Lee Harrington (born 28 November 1979) is a sexuality and spirituality educator, author, and artist, currently based in Denver, Colorado. Born in Lowell, Massachusetts, he began transitioning from female to male in 2007.

Author and educator

Lee Harrington has had his writing and poetry appear in numerous magazines, anthologies, and books on the subjects of rope bondage, ageplay, spirituality, transgender rights, paganism and erotica. His book Shibari You Can Use: Japanese Rope Bondage and Erotic Macrame received the National Leather Association International’s Geoff Mains Book Award for 2008, and his books Playing Well With Others: Your Field Guide to Discovering, Exploring and Navigating the Kink, Leather and BDSM Communities (written with Mollena Williams) and More Shibari You Can Use: Passionate Rope Bondage & Intimate Connection received the National Leather Association International’s Geoff Mains Non-fiction book award for 2013 and 2016 respectively.

Model and photographer

From 1999 to 2006, Harrington was an adult film actor, pornographer, and sex blogger.  He placed in the 2005 SIGNY Award for Best Bondage Model, and appeared on more than 70 adult websites (including Kink.com), various television appearances (such as Playboy's Sexcetera), and in a variety feature-length adult films.

Bibliography

Books authored

List of books authored by Harrington:

 Playing Well With Others: Your Field Guide to Discovering, Exploring and Navigating the Kink, Leather and BDSM Communities (2012)   (written with Mollena Williams) 
 Sacred Kink: The Eightfold Path of BDSM and Beyond (2010) 
 The Toybag Guide to Age Play (2007) 
 Shibari You Can Use: Japanese Rope Bondage and Erotic Macramé (2006) 
 More Shibari You Can Use: Passionate Rope Bondage & Intimate Connection (2015) 
 Traversing Gender: Understanding Transgender Realities (2016) 
 On Starry Thighs: Sacred and Sensual Poetry (2015)

Books edited

List of books authored by Harrington:

 Spirit of Desire: Personal Explorations of Sacred Kink (2011) 
 Rope, Bondage, and Power (2009)

References

External links
 Personal Blog

BDSM writers
Transgender men
Bondage riggers
American erotic artists
American sex educators
1979 births
Living people
American transgender writers